Rybníček may refer to:

 Rybníček (Havlíčkův Brod District), a village in the Czech Republic
 Rybníček (Vyškov District), a village in the Czech Republic